Ian James Warrington  is a New Zealand horticultural scientist and science administrator. He is a former chief executive of HortResearch (now Plant & Food Research). He was a senior administrator at Massey University until his position was axed in a cost-saving move.

Warrington received the T. K. Sidey Medal in 1984, an award set up by the Royal Society of New Zealand for outstanding scientific research. In the 2011 New Year Honours, Warrington was appointed a Companion of the New Zealand Order of Merit, for services to science.

References

People from Palmerston North
New Zealand scientists
Academic staff of the Massey University
Companions of the New Zealand Order of Merit
New Zealand horticulturists
Living people
Year of birth missing (living people)